Calcomp Technology, Inc., often referred to as Calcomp or CalComp, was a company best known for its Calcomp plotters.

History
It was founded as California Computer Products, Inc in 1959, located in Anaheim, California.

Sanders Associates, Inc., purchased Calcomp in 1980. In 1986, Sanders Associates was purchased by the Lockheed Corporation, and merged into Lockheed's Information Systems Group. Lockheed kept CalComp as a brand name.

Shutdown

Calcomp Technology shut down its operations in 1999, and transferred different product lines to various other companies, some of whom continue to use the "Calcomp" or other "Cal-" trademarks:
 Technical Services and spare parts: CalGraph Technology Services, Inc.
 TechJet 5500 Large Format Inkjet Plotter / Printer Information: CalComp Graphics.
 Digitizer, Tablets and scanners: GTCO CalComp, Inc.
 Film Imaging Systems: EcoPro Imaging (now part of OYO Instruments)
 Cutter and sign maker products: Westcomp

Products
It produced a wide range of plotters (both drum and flat-bed), digitizers, thermal transfer color printers, thermal plotters (InfoWorld June 13, 1994 p. 40) and other graphic input/output devices. In 1969, it produced about 80% of all plotters worldwide.

It also produced IBM plug compatible (PCM) disk and tape products. The disk products ranged from 2311 (CD-1,5, 17, 18, 24, 25) through 3350 equivalents. The tape product was a 3420 equivalent.

Calcomp acquired Talos and Summagraphics, which had acquired Houston Instruments.

Houston Instruments
Houston Instruments was another manufacturer of pen plotters. They used the DMPL plotting control language. They competed with Hewlett Packard plotters such as the HP 7470.
They were purchased by Summagraphics.
 DMP-29
 DMP-40, DMP-41, DMP-42
 DMP-50, DMP-51, DMP-51MP, DMP-52, DMP-52MP, DMP-55, DMP-56
 DMP-60, DMP-61, DMP-61DL, DMP-62, DMP-62DL, DMP-63, DMP-64, DMP-65C
 DMP-161, DMP-162, DMP-162R

Computer division
In 1987, CalComp sold its computer division to a company that focuses on CAD/CAM.

References

External links
Referenceforbusiness.com: "History of Calcomp (California Computer Products, Inc.)"

1958 establishments in California
1980 disestablishments in California
American companies established in 1958
Companies based in Anaheim, California
Computer companies established in 1958
Computer companies disestablished in 1980
Computer printer companies
Defunct companies based in Greater Los Angeles
Defunct computer companies based in California
Defunct computer companies of the United States
Defunct computer hardware companies
Graphics hardware
Lockheed Corporation
Technology companies based in Greater Los Angeles
Technology companies established in 1958
Technology companies disestablished in 1980